The 26th Robert Awards ceremony was held on 1 February 2009 in Copenhagen, Denmark. Organized by the Danish Film Academy, the awards honoured the best in Danish and foreign film of 2008.

Honorees

Best Danish Film 
 Terribly Happy – Henrik Ruben Genz

Best Children's Film 
 Max Pinlig -

Best Director 
 Henrik Ruben Genz – Terribly Happy

Best Screenplay 
 Dunja Gry Jensen & Henrik Ruben Genz – Terribly Happy

Best Actor in a Leading Role 
 Jakob Cedergren – Terribly Happy

Best Actress in a Leading Role 
 Lene Maria Christensen – Terribly Happy

Best Actor in a Supporting Role 
 Jens Jørn Spottag – Worlds Apart

Best Actress in a Supporting Role 
 Sarah Boberg – Worlds Apart

Best Production Design 
 Jette Lehmann – Flame & Citron

Best Cinematography 
 Jørgen Johansson – Terribly Happy

Best Costume Design 
 Manon Rasmussen – Flame & Citron

Best Makeup 
 Sabine Schumann & Jens Bartram – Flame & Citron

Best Editing 
 Anne Østerud – Worlds Apart

Best Sound Design 
 Hans Møller – Flame & Citron

Best Score 
  - The Candidate

Best Special Effects 
 Hummer Højmark, Jonas Drehn & Thomas Busk – Flame & Citron

Best Song 
 Kira Skov – "Riders of the freeway" – Terribly Happy

Best Short Fiction/Animation 
 Cathrine – Mads Matthiesen

Best Long Fiction/Animation 
 En forelskelse – Christian Tafdrup

Best Documentary Short 
 Lille voksen – Anders Gustafsson & Patrik Book

Best Documentary Feature 
 Burma VJ – Anders Høgsbro Østergaard

Best American Film 
 No Country for Old Men – Ethan Coen and Joel Coen

Best Non-American Film 
 Everlasting Moments – Jan Troell

Audience Award

Robert 25 Years Jubilee Award 
 Ebbe Iversen

See also 

 2009 Bodil Awards

References

External links 
  

2009 in Denmark
Robert Awards ceremonies
2009 in Copenhagen
February 2009 events in Europe